Jack Colletto (born November 19, 1998) is an American football linebacker and fullback for the Oregon State Beavers. He was the recipient of the 2022 Paul Hornung Award, given to the most versatile player in college football.

Early life and high school
Colletto grew up in Camas, Washington and attended Camas High School, where he played baseball, basketball, and football. He was named the Washington Gatorade Player of the Year as a senior after passing for 2,846 yards and 27 touchdowns while also rushing for 1,253 yards and 21 touchdowns. While Colletto was recruited by some Division I schools, he opted to enroll at Arizona Western College.

College career
Colletto began his college career at Arizona Western College. As a freshman, he completed 39-of-67 pass attempts for 548 yards and four touchdowns and rushed 43 times for 185 yards and nine touchdowns. Colletto committed to transfer to Oregon State after his freshman season.

Colletto spent his first season primarily as the Beavers' backup quarterback and was used in short-yardage situations. He made one start, which was a 41-34 win over Colorado in which he completed six of 14 pass attempts for 35 yards and one interception and ran for two touchdowns. Colletto was moved to linebacker during spring practices in 2019. He played in four games before redshirting the season, playing both linebacker and also seeing time as a rushing quarterback. Colletto continued to play linebacker as well as fullback as a redshirt junior. He was named second team All-Pac-12 Conference in 2021 after rushing for 144 yards and eight touchdowns and making eight tackles with one forced fumble and an interception on defense. Colletto won the Paul Hornung Award as the most versatile player in college football in 2022.

References

External links
Oregon State Beavers bio

Living people
Players of American football from Washington (state)
American football linebackers
Oregon State Beavers football players
Arizona Western Matadors football players
American football fullbacks
American football quarterbacks
People from Camas, Washington
Year of birth missing (living people)